Sylvester "Selo" Black Crow (July 23, 1932 – March 5, 2004) was a leader of the Oglala Lakota people, and activist.

Life
He served in the army as a paratrooper and pathfinder during the Korean War. He was an award-winning rodeo rider for many years.

In 1968, Black Crow, along with Leonard Crow Dog and six other men, brought the Sun Dance back to the Lakota People.

He traveled to Washington, D.C. to meet with President Gerald Ford to gain approval for the American Indian Religious Freedom Act in 1978. In 1980, he attended a storytelling conference at University of North Dakota.

He sued over religious practices at Bear Butte.
In January, 2000, he was one of the Traditional Elders, who occupied the Tribal Council Building on the Pine Ridge Indian Reservation.

A transitional house in Minnesota is named for him.

References

External links
"American Indian Movement will get written apology, guarantee for using Valmont Butte", Boulder Daily Camera, Amy Hebert, January 24, 2004
"DOG-KILLERS", ZYZZYVA, Vol. 56, 1999.

1932 births
2004 deaths
Lakota leaders
United States Army personnel of the Korean War
Native American United States military personnel
Native American activists
People from the Pine Ridge Indian Reservation, South Dakota
United States Army soldiers